The 1874 Franklin by-election was a by-election held on 9 April 1874 in the  electorate during the 5th New Zealand Parliament.

The by-election was caused by the resignation of the incumbent MP Archibald Clark on 2 February 1874.

At the nomination meeting, five candidates were nominated, four of whom were present and addressed the electors. The four were William Woodward, William Goodfellow, Joseph May, and Frank Henry Troupe. Joseph Dargaville was the candidate who was absent. Subsequent to the nomination meeting, Woodward sent a telegram of withdrawal and Dargaville also "retired", but both were included in the official results. The by-election was won by May.

Results

References

Franklin 1874
1874 elections in New Zealand
Politics of the Auckland Region
April 1874 events